
Gmina Pęcław is a rural gmina (administrative district) in Głogów County, Lower Silesian Voivodeship, in south-western Poland.

Neighbouring gminas
Gmina Pęcław is bordered by the gminas of Głogów, Grębocice, Niechlów, Rudna and Szlichtyngowa.

Villages
The gmina contains the villages of Białołęka, Borków, Droglowice, Golkowice, Kaczyce, Kotowice, Leszkowice, Mileszyn, Pęcław, Piersna, Turów, Wierzchownia, Wietszyce and Wojszyn.

References

Peclaw
Głogów County